Makedonska Kamenica is a municipality in eastern North Macedonia. Makedonska Kamenica is also the name of the town where the municipal seat is found. The municipality is part of Eastern Statistical Region.

Geography
The municipality borders Kriva Palanka Municipality in the north, Bulgaria and Delčevo Municipality to the east, Kočani Municipality to the west, and Vinica Municipality to the south.

Demographics
Makedonska Kamenica Municipality had 6,439 residents at the 2021 Macedonian census. Ethnic groups in the municipality:

Inhabited places

References

External links
Official website

 
Municipalities of North Macedonia
Eastern Statistical Region